Slüz Düz Music is the debut album by American multi-instrumentalist Peter Ostroushko, released in 1985.

"Sluz Duz" is an Old World sound developed by Ostroushko that combines the dance music of the Ukraine and other European countries with American blugrass, ragtime and swing. The bluegrass band Hot Rize is also featured on the album.

Reception

Writing for Allmusic, music critic Steven Thomas Erlewine wrote of the album "... the result is quite intriguing, even if his ambition sometimes doesn't match his grasp"

Track listing 
All songs by Peter Ostroushko.
"The Last Stand" – 3:45
"Friedrich Polka" – 3:23
"Marjorie's Waltz" – 4:55
"Fiddle Tune Medley:" – 4:19
"My Love, I Miss Her So"
"Farewell to Calgary"
"Burnt Biscuit Breakdown" – 4:55
"Sleepy Jesus Rag" – 3:44
"Slüz-Düz Polka	" – 3:45
"Katerina's Waltz" – 4:28
"Christian Creek" – 4:00
"Co. Kerry to Kiev Medley:" – 7:01
"McIntyre's Hornpipe"
"The Mist on the Lake"
"McIntyre's Reel"

Personnel
Peter Ostroushko – mandolin, fiddle, mandola, guitar, mandocello
Norman Blake – guitar
Bruce Calin – bass
John Angus Foster – bass, piano
Tim Hennessy – guitar
Red Maddock – drums
Mick Moloney – banjo, tenor banjo
Paddy O'Brien – accordion
Tim O'Brien – fiddle
Charles Sawtelle – guitar
Daíthí Sproule – guitar
Butch Thompson – piano
Pete Wernick – banjo, fiddle
Bruce Allard – violin
John Anderson – bodhrán
Nancy Blake – cello

Production notes
Peter Ostroushko – producer,  liner notes, mixing
Tom Mudge – engineer
Lynne Cruise – engineer, mixing
John Scherf – assistant engineer
Jonathan Wyner – mastering
Nancy Given – reissue design

References

1985 debut albums
Peter Ostroushko albums
Rounder Records albums